Hampton is a village in Rock Island County, Illinois, United States. The population was 1,863 at the 2010 census.

History
The village was originally in territory claimed by the Sauk and Fox Indians, and several Woodland era Native mounds are located in the village limits, and in the adjacent Illiniwek Forest Preserve. The village in 1834 was platted as "Milan" (not the village 13 miles south-southwest in Illinois—see Milan, Illinois for more). The "paper town" did not sell initially because of the swampy riverfront, and being adjacent to the north end of the Rock Island Rapids. However, settlers drained the swamps by the end of the 19th century, and the village was founded by 1900 as Hampton— the original name of Milan, Illinois. Black's Store, which is listed on the National Register of Historic Places, was the first mercantile store to open in Northwest Illinois.

Geography
Hampton is located at  (41.557583, -90.407993).

Demographics

As of the census of 2000, there were 1,626 people, 631 households, and 480 families residing in the village. The racial makeup of the village was 95.57% White, 0.25% African American, 0.86% Native American, 0.12% Asian, 2.21% from other races, and 0.98% from two or more races. Hispanic or Latino of any race were 4.92% of the population.

There were 631 households, out of which 28.5% had children under the age of 18 living with them, 66.6% were married couples living together, 7.1% had a female householder with no husband present, and 23.9% were non-families. 20.3% of all households were made up of individuals, and 11.1% had someone living alone who was 65 years of age or older. The average household size was 2.56 and the average family size was 2.95.

In the village, the population was spread out, with 23.1% under the age of 18, 7.1% from 18 to 24, 25.5% from 25 to 44, 30.8% from 45 to 64, and 13.5% who were 65 years of age or older. The median age was 41 years. For every 100 females, there were 94.0 males. For every 100 females age 18 and over, there were 94.1 males.

The median income for a household in the village was $48,438, and the median income for a family was $59,375. Males had a median income of $42,134 versus $25,063 for females. The per capita income for the village was $22,492. About 5.4% of families and 7.3% of the population were below the poverty line, including 10.0% of those under age 18 and 9.7% of those age 65 or over.

References

External links
 Village of Hampton official website

Villages in Rock Island County, Illinois
Villages in Illinois
Cities in the Quad Cities
Populated places established in 1834
Illinois populated places on the Mississippi River
1834 establishments in Illinois